'Goliah may refer to:

 Goliah (steam tug 1849)
 USS Goliath, also known as the USS Catskill (1862)
 USS Goliah (SP-1494), an armed tug that served in the United States Navy as a patrol vessel and tug from 1918 to 1919.
"Goliah", a short story by Jack London published in 1908 in British periodical Red Magazine and in 1910 in Revolution and Other Essays